Colonel General Aleksandr Vasilievich Shlyakhturov (born 14 February 1947) was a Russian military officer.

Shlyakhturov was appointed head of the Main Intelligence Directorate (GRU) of the Russian General Staff, Russia's largest intelligence agency, on 24 April 2009. Prior to this, Shlyakhturov had served as first deputy to the previous head of the organisation, Gen. Valentin Korabelnikov. Korabelnikov had apparently tendered his resignation earlier in year due to disagreements over reforms of the organisation. Shlyakhturov resigned as head by end of 2011 due to age limits.

He was replaced by Igor Sergun in December 2011.

References

External links
  

Russian politicians
GRU Chiefs
Living people
1947 births